Vallée d'Osterlog or Osterlog Valley is a botanical garden of Mauritian endemic species and a rehabilitated indigenous forest, situated in Le Val, in the south-east of Mauritius.

It was founded on the 11 June 2014.

Location

The 275 hectare garden & forest is located in the region of Le Val, near Le Val Nature Park in the south-east of the island. It is in the Creole Mountain range, specifically between Mount Lagrave and Mount Laselle. It also lies almost exactly on the border of two districts - that of Grand Port and Moka. It is reached by road from Le Saint, Hubert Village. The offices of the Vallée d'Osterlog Endemic Garden Foundation are in Wooton, Eau Coulée.

References

Tourist attractions in Mauritius
Botanical gardens in Mauritius
Geography of Mauritius
Environment of Mauritius
Protected areas of Mauritius